Jeppe Hansen (born 10 February 1989) is a Danish professional footballer who plays as a forward for Aarhus Fremad.

Hansen, who began his career with his hometown club FC Fredericia, has also played for Otterup B&IK, Næsby BK and OB, as well as Icelandic sides Stjarnan, KR and Keflavík

Career
Hansen began his career as a youth player with his local side FC Fredericia, before making small number of appearances for the first team. After spells with lower league clubs Otterup B&IK and Otterup B&IK, he signed a one-year deal with Danish Superliga club OB, where he scored 1 goal in 8 matches. After his contract ended in May 2014, Hansen moved to Iceland, signing for Úrvalsdeild club Stjarnan. However, Hansen remained in Iceland for just two months, before returning to his hometown team FC Fredericia where he signed a two-year deal. During this time, however, Hansen expressed his desire to return to Iceland, and in January 2015, he once again signed for Stjarnan.

After a successful season with Stjarnan, in which he scored 12 goals in 32 matches, Hansen was signed by Icelandic giants KR in July 2016. At the end of the 2016 Icelandic season, Hansen agreed a two-year deal with 1. deild side Keflavík.

In January 2019, Hansen joined Danish third tier club Kolding IF. He reached promotion to the second division in his first season with the club. After 1,5-years at the club, Hansen left and signed for Aarhus Fremad on 5 June 2021.

References

External links

1989 births
Living people
People from Fredericia
Association football forwards
Danish men's footballers
Danish expatriate men's footballers
FC Fredericia players
Odense Boldklub players
Jeppe Hansen
Knattspyrnufélag Reykjavíkur players
Knattspyrnudeild Keflavík players
Danish Superliga players
Úrvalsdeild karla (football) players
Næsby Boldklub players
Kolding IF players
Aarhus Fremad players
Íþróttabandalag Akraness players
Danish 1st Division players
Danish 2nd Division players
Danish expatriate sportspeople in Iceland
Expatriate footballers in Iceland
Sportspeople from the Region of Southern Denmark